Fusobacterium mortiferum is a bacterium in the family Fusobacteriaceae.

References

Bacteria described in 1901
Fusobacteriota